The 2016 African Women's Handball Champions League was the 38th edition, organized by the African Handball Confederation, under the auspices of the International Handball Federation, the handball sport governing body. The tournament was held from October 21–30, 2015 at the Palais des Sports de Ouagadougou, in Burkina Faso, contested by 9 teams and won by Clube Desportivo Primeiro de Agosto of Angola.

Draw

Preliminary round
Times given below are in GMT UTC+0.

Group A

* Note:  Advance to quarter-finals

Group B

* Note:  Advance to quarter-finals Relegated to 9th place classification

Knockout stage

Championship bracket

5-8th bracket

Final ranking

See also
 2016 African Women's Handball Cup Winners' Cup
 2015 African Women's Handball Championship

References

External links
 Official website

2016 African Women's Handball Champions League
2016 African Women's Handball Champions League
African Women's Handball Champions League
Handball in Burkina Faso